Dana Leanne Oxley (born December 21, 1967) is an associate justice of the Iowa Supreme Court.

Education 

Oxley obtained a Bachelor of Arts in accounting from the University of Northern Iowa in 1990. She earned her Juris Doctor from the University of Iowa College of Law in 1998. In law school, she was articles editor of the Journal of Corporation Law, graduated third in her class, and was elected to the Order of the Coif.

Legal and academic career 

Oxley joined the Cedar Rapids law firm Shuttleworth & Ingersoll in 1999. She was then a career law clerk for Judge David R. Hansen of the United States Court of Appeals for the Eighth Circuit from 2001 to 2011. When Hansen retired in 2011, Oxley returned to resume her career at Shuttleworth & Ingersoll and specialized in civil appellate litigation. She taught at Iowa Law in 2007, 2011, and from 2014 to the present. She also was an editor of the Eighth Circuit Appellate Practice Manual.

Appointment to Iowa Supreme Court 

On January 28, 2020, Governor Kim Reynolds appointed Oxley to the Iowa Supreme Court to the seat vacated by the death of Mark Cady. It is the first time the Supreme Court will have two women serving simultaneously.

References

External links 

1967 births
Living people
Place of birth missing (living people)
20th-century American lawyers
21st-century American lawyers
21st-century American judges
Iowa lawyers
Justices of the Iowa Supreme Court
University of Iowa College of Law alumni
University of Iowa College of Law faculty
University of Northern Iowa alumni
20th-century American women lawyers
21st-century American women lawyers
21st-century American women judges
American women academics